Liuhang is a station on Line 7 of the Shanghai Metro, located in Baoshan District. It opened on June 30, 2011, half a year later than the opening of the phase 2 northern extension of the line.

References

Railway stations in Shanghai
Line 7, Shanghai Metro
Shanghai Metro stations in Baoshan District
Railway stations in China opened in 2011